The Logan House, in the area of Finchville, Kentucky, was built in about 1860.  It was listed on the National Register of Historic Places in 1988.

It is a center passage plan brick building on an ashlar foundation.  The house is believed to have been built around 1860 "by a descendant of Kentucky pioneer Benjamin Logan who settled on this site in 1794 on a 1,000-acre land grant. Logan is said to have built a house and grist mill on the site and lived here until his death in 1802."

The listing included five contributing buildings.

References

Houses on the National Register of Historic Places in Kentucky
Houses completed in 1860
Houses in Shelby County, Kentucky
National Register of Historic Places in Shelby County, Kentucky
1860 establishments in Kentucky
Central-passage houses